Koziara is a Polish surname. Notable people with the surname include:

 Gail Koziara Boudreaux (born 1960), American businesswoman and athlete
 Ian Koziara, American operatic tenor

See also
 

Polish-language surnames